The 2015–16 Cypriot First Division was the 77th season of the Cypriot top-level football league. It began on 22 August 2015 and ended on 15 May 2016. APOEL were the defending champions.

The league expanded from 12 to 14 teams this season, comprised eleven teams from the 2014–15 season and three promoted teams from the 2014–15 Second Division. APOEL were crowned champions for the 25th time and a fourth time in a row, securing the title after beating title rivals AEK Larnaca 2–0 at home on 28 April 2016.

Teams

Promotion and relegation (pre-season)
Othellos Athienou was relegated at the end of the second-phase of the 2014–15 season after finishing in the last place of the relegation group table.

The relegated team was replaced by 2014–15 Second Division champions Enosis Neon Paralimni, runners-up Pafos FC and third-placed team Aris Limassol.

Stadia and locations

Note: Table lists clubs in alphabetical order.

Personnel and kits
Note: Flags indicate national team as has been defined under FIFA eligibility rules. Players and Managers may hold more than one non-FIFA nationality.

Managerial changes

Regular season

League table

Results

Championship round

Table

Results

Relegation round

Table

Results

Season statistics

Top scorers
Including matches played on 15 May 2016; Source: Cyprus Football Association

Hat-tricks

Scoring
First goal of the season: 2 minutes and 40 seconds –  Koullis Pavlou (Nea Salamina) against Omonia (19:02 EET, 22 August 2015)
Fastest goal of the season: 0 minutes and 34 seconds –  Nikos Englezou (AEK) against Enosis (26 September 2015)
Latest goal of the season: 96 minutes and 20 seconds –  Joël Damahou (Pafos) against Nea Salamina (18 January 2016)
First scored penalty kick of the season: 93 minutes and 38 seconds –  Cillian Sheridan (Omonia) against Nea Salamina (20:48 EET, 22 August 2015)
First own goal of the season: 73 minutes and 8 seconds –  Aritz López Garai (Doxa) for Ethnikos (20:28 EET, 23 August 2015)
Most goals scored in a match by one player: 3 goals
 Dino Ndlovu (Anorthosis) against Nea Salamina (29 August 2015)
 Fernando Cavenaghi (APOEL) against AEL (17 October 2015)
 Anton Maglica (Apollon) against Pafos (20 February 2016)
Most scored goals in a single fixture – 30 goals (Fixture 8)
Fixture 8 results: Ayia Napa 0–3 Apollon, Omonia 6–0 Pafos, Anorthosis 4–0 Ermis, Ethnikos 0–2 AEK, Doxa 2–1 Enosis, AEL 1–2 Aris, Nea Salamina 0–9 APOEL. 
 Highest scoring game: 9 goals
Nea Salamina 0–9 APOEL (26 October 2015)
 Largest winning margin: 9 goals
Nea Salamina 0–9 APOEL (26 October 2015)
 Most goals scored in a match by a single team: 9 goals
Nea Salamina 0–9 APOEL (26 October 2015)
 Most goals scored by a losing team: 3 goals
Omonia 5–3 Nea Salamina (22 August 2015)
Aris 4–3 Doxa (15 May 2016)

Discipline
 First yellow card of the season: 6 minutes –  Ivan Ćurjurić for Nea Salamina against Omonia (19:06 EET, 22 August 2015)
 First red card of the season: 70 minutes –  Levan Khmaladze for Pafos against AEK (20:25 EET, 22 August 2015)
 Most yellow cards in a single match: 12
 AEK 1–2 Nea Salamina – 5 for AEK (Toño Ramírez (2), Albert Serrán (2), Jorge Monteiro) and 7 for Nea Salamina (Marko Andić, Aldo Adorno, China (2), Ioannis Kousoulos, Giannis Skopelitis, Dimitar Makriev) (19 October 2015)
 Omonia 0–2 APOEL – 6 for Omonia (Ivan Runje, Giorgos Economides, Renato Margaça, Nuno Assis, George Florescu, Carlitos) and 6 for APOEL (Iñaki Astiz, Nuno Morais, Tomás De Vincenti (2), Constantinos Charalambides, Giannis Gianniotas) (23 April 2016)
 Most red cards in a single match: 3
 AEK 1–2 Nea Salamina – 2 for AEK (Albert Serrán, Toño Ramírez) and 1 for Nea Salamina (China) (19 October 2015)

References

Sources

External links
 uefa.com

Cypriot First Division seasons
Cyprus
1